Confederation of Independent Football Association (CONIFA) is the football Association organizing football games outside FIFA. And CONIFA Africa is the continental body for CONIFA.

Members

List of members
As of January 2022

Important personalities

Africa President

References

Confederation of Independent Football Associations
Association football governing bodies in Africa